Chakosi, also known by its autonym Anufo, is a Central Tano language spoken in northeast Ghana, northern Togo, northwest Benin and Ivory Coast by approximately 180,000 people.

Phonology

References

Central Tano languages
Languages of Togo
Languages of Benin
Languages of Ghana